The 1916 Chicago Cubs season was the 45th season of the Chicago Cubs franchise, the 41st in the National League and the 1st at Wrigley Field (then known as "Weeghman Park"). The Cubs finished fifth in the National League with a record of 67–86.

Regular season

Season standings

Record vs. opponents

Notable transactions 
 August 28, 1916: Heinie Zimmerman and Mickey Doolan were traded by the Cubs to the New York Giants for Larry Doyle, Merwin Jacobson, and Herb Hunter.

Roster

Player stats

Batting

Starters by position 
Note: Pos = Position; G = Games played; AB = At bats; H = Hits; Avg. = Batting average; HR = Home runs; RBI = Runs batted in

Other batters 
Note: G = Games played; AB = At bats; H = Hits; Avg. = Batting average; HR = Home runs; RBI = Runs batted in

Pitching

Starting pitchers 
Note: G = Games pitched; IP = Innings pitched; W = Wins; L = Losses; ERA = Earned run average; SO = Strikeouts

Other pitchers 
Note: G = Games pitched; IP = Innings pitched; W = Wins; L = Losses; ERA = Earned run average; SO = Strikeouts

References

External links
1916 Chicago Cubs season at Baseball Reference

Chicago Cubs seasons
Chicago Cubs season
Chicago Cubs